Appendix is a Finnish punk rock band. It was founded in 1980 and has released five studio albums.

Their debut album was released in 1983. It was later re-issued by the German label Rock-O-Rama with an English title Money Is Not My Currency.

Olli Lindholm, the lead singer of one of Finland's highest selling rock groups Yö, is a former member of Appendix. In the spring 2015 Appendix had a West Coast Tour in United States and they performed at Manic Relapse festivals as the lead performer in Oakland, California.

Discography

Singles and EPs 
EP (1982)
Huora (1983, Propaganda Records)
Suomineito (1996, Propaganda Records)
Pop-idols (2006, UHO Production)
TV (2012, Propaganda Records)

Studio albums 
Ei raha oo mun valuuttaa (1982, Propaganda Records)
Money Is Not My Currency (1983, re-issue, Rock-O-Rama)
Top of the Pops (1984, Rock-O-Rama/Propaganda Records)
Syyntakeeton (2006, UHO Production)
Studio-Live (2011, Propaganda Records)
Extraneus (2013, Propaganda Records)

Compilation albums 
Diagnosis (Years 1982–83)  (1994, Propaganda Records)
PAROCK (2002, Propaganda Records)

References 
 Olli Lindholmin oppivuodet & videos, Yle
 Parasta lapsille - Suomipunk 1977-1984 (Mika Saastamoinen, Johnny Kniga), book
 Jungle, record collector magazine; 1/1995
 Suomipunk 1977–1998 (Jarkko Kuivanen, Yle); book
 JEeJEeJEe – suomalaisen rockin historia (WSOY); pp. 324–327
 JeeJeeJee/Radiomafia (Santtu Luoto, Yle); parts From Propaganda to hardcore and Yö-part

External links 
Appendix Official Homepage
Appedix performing in 1984 – Finnish Broadcasting Company's archives

Finnish hardcore punk groups
Musical groups from Pori